Carcha is a genus of snout moths. It was described by Francis Walker in 1859, and is known from the Dominican Republic and Venezuela.

Species
 Carcha hersilialis Walker, 1859
 Carcha undulatalis Amsel, 1956
 Carcha violalis Hampson, 1897

References

Chrysauginae
Pyralidae genera